Paneth is a lunar impact crater that is located on the far side of the Moon, just beyond the northwestern limb. It lies just to the north-northeast of the crater Smoluchowski, and to the east-southeast of Boole on the near side.

The rim of Paneth is worn, but only moderately; the edge remains well-defined and marked only by small craters along the northwest and southeast. This formation partly overlies a shallower crater Paneth K along the southeast of the rim. Only a narrow strip of terrain separates Paneth from Smoluchowski, and this ground is marked by an elongated crater and a short rille.

The interior floor has a central peak formation near the midpoint and a pair of small craters along the eastern rim. The inner surface is otherwise relatively flat and marked only by tiny craterlets.

Satellite craters
By convention, these features are identified on lunar maps by placing the letter on the side of the crater midpoint that is closest to Paneth.

References

 
 
 
 
 
 
 
 
 
 
 
 

Impact craters on the Moon